Beyond is a 2000 studio album by American jazz saxophonist Joshua Redman released through Warner Bros. Records.

Background
"Just as always, the music here is performed with honest expression," Redman notes. "I'm not deliberately trying to write material that's difficult to play.... There's a balance between complexity and simplicity, between formal sophistication and emotional directness."

Reception
John Murph of JazzTimes wrote "With all the extracurricular glamour that surrounds Joshua Redman, sometimes it's hard to focus on Redman the jazz musician, rather than Redman the ubiquitous, fashion-conscious celebrity. Redman's latest album, Beyond, doesn't depart sonically from his previous works, its compositional zeal suggests he's indeed on his way to living up to all the hype." David Adler of All About Jazz added "Although it is probably Redman's finest album to date, Beyond still doesn't rise to the level of true greatness in the field of composition. It would be hard for even a genius to measure up to the industry hype that has surrounded Redman for nearly a decade. But this makes it even more essential that critics evaluate Redman's work just as they would that of any other brilliant and hard-working, yet far more obscure, figure on the scene. This is not to take anything away from Redman, but rather to keep matters in their proper perspective."

Geoffrey Himes of The Washington Post commented "Because Redman is working with familiar partners and because he has thought these pieces through, they boast a logical, cohesive development that few modern jazz recordings can match." Jeff Simon of The Buffalo News stated, "Beyond, in fact, may be the best record yet by Joshua Redman."

Track listing

Personnel
Musicians
Joshua Redman – tenor, alto and soprano Saxophone
Mark Turner - tenor sax (track 4)
Aaron Goldberg – piano
Reuben Rogers – bass
Gregory Hutchinson – drums

Production
Joshua Redman – producer
James Farber – associate producer, engineer
Greg Calbi – engineer (mastering)
ndrea Yankovsky – engineer (assistant)
Anthony Gorman – engineer (assistant)
Paul Boothe – production manager (production assistant)
Wilkins Management, Inc. – management
Frank Olinsky –  art direction
Frank W. Ockenfels III – photography
Paul Silver – photography (of band)

Media Appearances
Two of Joshua Redman's songs "Courage (Asymmetric Aria)" and "Balance" were featured on The Weather Channel's "Local Forecast" segments.

References

External links
 

Joshua Redman albums
2000 albums
Post-bop albums
Warner Records albums